The Prime Minister's Office (PMO) (IAST: Pradhānamantrī Kāryālaya) consists of the immediate staff of the Prime Minister of India, as well as multiple levels of support staff reporting to the Prime Minister. The PMO is headed by the Principal Secretary, currently Pramod Kumar Misra. The PMO was originally called the Prime Minister's Secretariat until 1977, when it was renamed during the Morarji Desai ministry.

It is part of the Government of India located in the South Block of the Secretariat Building.

The Prime Minister's Official Website is available in 11 Indian languages namely Assamese, Bengali, Gujarati, Kannada, Malayalam, Meitei (Manipuri), Marathi, Odia, Punjabi, Tamil and Telugu in addition to English and Hindi, out of the 22 official languages of the Indian Republic.

History
During the tenure of Jawaharlal Nehru as Prime Minister, the then Prime Minister's Secretariat was headed by a Joint Secretary until his death. The post of Principal Secretary to Prime Minister was created during the tenure of Indira Gandhi as Prime Minister. The Principal Secretary to PM is the head of the Prime Minister's Office.

Function
The PMO provides secretarial assistance to the Prime Minister. It is headed by the Principal Secretary to the Prime Minister. The PMO includes the anti-corruption unit and the public wing dealing with grievances. The office houses the Prime Minister and few selected officers of Indian Civil Service who work with him to manage and coordinate government and his office. The Prime Minister through his office coordinates with all ministers in the central union cabinet, minister of independent charges and governors and ministers of state government. The PMO is located at the South Block of the Secretariat Building.

The subject-matter of files required to be submitted to the Prime Minister depends on whether he is holding direct charge of the Ministry or whether there is a Cabinet Minister or Minister of State (Independent Charge) in charge of the Ministry. In the case of the latter, most matters are dealt with by the Cabinet Minister / Minister of State-in-charge. Only important policy issues, which the Minister concerned feels should be submitted to the Prime Minister for orders or information, are received in the PMO.

In cases where the Prime Minister is the Minister-in-charge, all matters requiring Ministerial approval not delegated to the Minister of State/Deputy Minister, if any, are submitted for orders. The Prime Minister has traditionally been the Minister-in-charge of the Ministry of Personnel, Public Grievances and Pensions and the Departments of Space and Atomic Energy.

Some of the important matters that require the Prime Minister's personal attention include the following:
 Important defence-related issues;
 Decorations, both civilian and defence, where Presidential approval is required;
 All important policy issues;
 Proposals for appointment of Indian Heads of Missions abroad and requests for grant of agreement for foreign Heads of Missions posted to India;
 All important decisions relating to the Cabinet Secretariat;
 Appointments to State Administrative Tribunals and the Central Administrative Tribunal, UPSC, Election Commission, Appointment of members of statutory/constitutional Committees, Commissions attached to various Ministries;
 All policy matters relating to the administration of the Indian Administrative Service and other Civil Services and administrative reforms;
 Special Packages announced by the Prime Minister for States are monitored in the PMO and periodical reports submitted to Prime Minister; and

Parliament Questions

Parliament Questions relating to the Ministries and Departments of which Prime Minister is the Minister-in-charge are answered by a Minister of State nominated for the purpose or by Prime Minister himself.

PM's Funds

The Prime Minister's National Relief Fund (PMNRF) and the National Defence Fund (NDF) are operated directly from the PMO. The Prime Minister's National Relief Fund was established in January 1948 as Trust, by then Prime Minister, Jawaharlal Nehru, with public contributions to assist displaced persons from Pakistan, due to partition of India. In the year 2013-2014, the Fund received donations worth .

The Office
The Prime Minister's Office (PMO) located in South Block, overlooking the grandeur of Rashtrapati Bhawan. Though in the 1990s I.K. Gujral and some of his predecessors, used Prime Minister's Residence (PMR) spread over a 10-acre complex as office. It is sandwiched between the cabinet secretariat on one side and the ministries of external affairs and defence on the other. The 20-room PMO is equipped to provide both infrastructural and manpower support to the nation's chief executive. Hi-tech accessories and sophisticated communication devices were installed to monitor domestic and international developments.

Important officers in the PMO

Organisation

Department of Atomic Energy (DAE)

 Regulatory Boards
 Atomic Energy Regulatory Board (AERB), Mumbai, Maharashtra
 Atomic Energy Commission (AEC) Mumbai, Maharashtra
 Board of Radiation and Isotope Technology (BRIT), Mumbai, Maharashtra
 Public Sector
 Electronics Corporation of India (ECIL), Hyderabad
 Indian Rare Earths Limited (IREL), Mumbai
 Nuclear Power Corporation of India (NPCIL), Mumbai, Maharashtra
 Uranium Corporation of India, Singhbhum
 Research & Development Sector
Bhabha Atomic Research Centre (BARC), Mumbai; the following research institutions are affiliated to BARC:
Atomic Minerals Directorate for Exploration and Research (AMD), Hyderabad
 Indira Gandhi Centre for Atomic Research (IGCAR), Kalpakkam, Tamil Nadu
 Raja Ramanna Centre for Advanced Technology, Indore
 Variable Energy Cyclotron Centre (VECC), Calcutta
 Aided Sector
Atomic Energy Education Society (AEES), Mumbai
 Tata Institute of Fundamental Research, Mumbai
 Tata Institute of Fundamental Research, Hyderabad
 Tata Memorial Centre, Mumbai
 Center for Excellence in Basic Sciences, Mumbai
 Saha Institute of Nuclear Physics (SINP), Kolkata
 Institute of Physics, Bhubaneswar
 Harish-Chandra Research Institute (HRI), Allahabad
 Institute of Mathematical Sciences (IMSc or Matscienc
 Institute for Plasma Research, Gandhinagar
 National Institute of Science Education and Research, Bhubaneswar
 Industries and Mining Sector
 Nuclear Fuel Complex (NFC), Hyderabad
 Heavy Water Board (HWB), Hyderabad

Department of Space 

The Department of Space manages the following agencies and institutes:
 Indian Space Research Organisation (ISRO) – The primary research and development arm of the DoS.
Vikram Sarabhai Space Centre (VSSC), Thiruvananthapuram.
 Liquid Propulsion Systems Centre (LPSC), Thiruvananthapuram.
 Satish Dhawan Space Centre (SDSC-SHAR), Sriharikota.
 ISRO Satellite Centre (ISAC), Bangalore.
Space Applications Centre (SAC), Ahmedabad.
 National Remote Sensing Centre (NRSC), Hyderabad.
 ISRO Inertial Systems Unit (IISU), Thiruvananthapuram.
 Development and Educational Communication Unit (DECU), Ahmedabad.
 Master Control Facility (MCF), Hassan.
 ISRO Telemetry, Tracking and Command Network (ISTRAC), Bangalore.
 Laboratory for Electro-Optics Systems (LEOS), Bangalore.
 Indian Institute of Remote Sensing (IIRS), Dehradun.
 Antrix Corporation – The marketing arm of ISRO.
 Physical Research Laboratory (PRL), Ahmedabad.
 National Atmospheric Research Laboratory (NARL), Gadanki.
 North-Eastern Space Applications Centre (NE-SAC), Umiam.
 Semi-Conductor Laboratory (SCL), Mohali.
 Indian Institute of Space Science and Technology (IIST), Thiruvananthapuram – India's space university

Project Monitoring Group 

In June 2013, a cell within the Cabinet Secretariat called the Project Monitoring Group was created to track stalled investment projects, both in the public and private sectors and to remove the implementation bottlenecks in these projects on a fast-track basis.

The Project Monitoring Group was moved to the Prime Minister's Office in 2014.

Notes

References

External links
  

 
Buildings and structures in Delhi
Government buildings in India
Prime Ministers of India